Subramanyam For Sale is a 2015 Telugu-language action romantic comedy film written and directed by Harish Shankar, produced by Dil Raju on Sri Venkateswara Creations banner. The film stars Sai Dharam Tej, Regina Cassandra, and Adah Sharma . The music is composed by Mickey J Meyer.  The film was later remade by Eskay Movies in Bengali in 2018 as Chalbaaz starring Bangladeshi superstar Shakib Khan and Subhashree Ganguly.

Plot

Subramanyam is a money-minded boy who goes to the United States to earn big bucks. One day, he comes across Seetha, who ran away on her marriage day. As time passes by, Seetha gets cheated by her boyfriend and is left stranded in the US, when Subramanyam comes to Seetha's rescue and solves her problems. The twist in the tale arises when Seetha requests Subramanyam to come along with her to India. Subramanyam accepts the proposal by demanding a huge amount. The couple lands in India, and to their surprise, the entire family misunderstands them to be already married.

Meanwhile, Govind, a dreaded don, is after Subramanyam for him to marry the former's sister Durga. Govind reaches Geetha's marriage and reveals the truth. Seetha returns to the States, and after a week, Subbu also returns. Seetha asks him about his wife, to which Subbu says that the marriage was broken. Both of them talk about how they will marry.

Cast

Soundtrack

The music was composed by Mickey J Meyer and Raj–Koti (remix of one song from Khaidi No. 786). The music released on Aditya Music Company. Audio was launched on 23 August 2015, held at Hyderabad Shilpakala Vedika by Chiranjeevi on the eve of his birthday.

Reception

References

External links
 

2015 films
Films directed by Harish Shankar
Films scored by Mickey J Meyer
2010s Telugu-language films
Indian action comedy films
Telugu films remade in other languages
Films shot in New Jersey
Films shot in India
2015 action comedy films
Sri Venkateswara Creations films